Sofia Ring Mall is a shopping mall in Sofia, Bulgaria. It opened doors on 6 November 2014. Sofia Ring Mall is a shopping center of new generation, which has two hundred stores representing over 400 brands of which 100 completely new to the Bulgarian market.

Sofia Ring Development will have a total cost of more than 300 million euro. The investment comes from the Greek companies Fourlis Group, which manages IKEA's franchising in Bulgaria, and Danaos Group, specialized in the shipping industry. In the near future it is expected that the Sofia Metro will have a nearby Metro station.

See also 
 List of malls in Sofia

References

External links 
 Sofia Ring Mall website (in Bulgarian and English)

Shopping malls in Sofia